Moltena is a genus of skippers in the family Hesperiidae. 
It is named after the town of Molteno, Eastern Cape.

Species
Moltena fiara (Butler, 1870)

References
Natural History Museum Lepidoptera genus database

External links
Moltena at funet

Erionotini
Hesperiidae genera